Robert East may refer to:

 Robert East (actor), Welsh actor, known for playing Harry, Prince of Wales in British TV series Blackadder
 Bobby East, Robert East, racing driver